"The World I Know" is a song by American band Collective Soul, originally released on their 1995 eponymous album. Written by lead singer and guitarist Ed Roland, "The World I Know" peaked at number 19 on the US Billboard Hot 100 chart when released as a single and spent four weeks at the number-one spot on the Billboard Mainstream Rock Tracks chart. In Canada, the song reached number one on the week of March 11, 1996, becoming the band's highest-charting single there.

Background
In a December 2017 interview with Songfacts, lead singer Ed Roland explained the inspiration behind "The World I Know":

During an interview on The Professor of Rock YouTube channel with Adam Reader that was posted on October 10, 2022, Ed corrected Adam on the official authorship credits for this song. When Adam mentioned, "Co-written with Ross Childress...", Ed stopped him and stated, "No, not co-written. And, I'm going to say it right now, he didn't write a damn thing. He didn't even play on the song. He gets credit, 'cause he wanted credit. And, at the early time of a band, you want to make sure everybody's clear and cool. He didn't write a damn thing."

Music video
The music video depicts a businessman who begins to go about his day, reading The New York Times on the way to his office. As he reads about death, and sees the homelessness and sadness on the street, he becomes disillusioned with his life and prepares to commit suicide. As he climbs to the roof of a nearby building, he takes off his shoes and looks at the ground crying. He stretches out his arms and readies himself to fall. However, just as he is about to fall, a dove lands on his arm. He feeds it with the bagel in his pocket, and the crumbs attract ants, which makes the man notice the similarities of them to the people walking below. He laughs throwing all his money at the people and pulls himself out of his state.

During the entire video, periodic cuts to singer Ed Roland looking on at the man while singing the song are shown. The video also shows sadness and happiness in the form of color hues for the video. While the man is disillusioned with his life and is thinking about suicide, the video is in a blue and purple tint, giving a dark feeling to the video. When the dove lands on the man's arm, the video's hue changes to show the normal colors of the city, also revealing the sun shining over the city, showing of the sudden change to happiness and relief.

Track listings
US CD and cassette single, Australian CD single
 "The World I Know" – 4:15
 "When the Water Falls" (live acoustic) – 3:41

US 7-inch single
A. "The World I Know" – 4:16
B. "Smashing Young Man" – 3:44

UK CD single
 "The World I Know" (edit) – 3:51
 "When the Water Falls" (live acoustic) – 3:41
 "The World I Know" (LP version) – 4:15

Charts

Weekly charts

Year-end charts

Release history

Cover versions
On May 20, 2008, David Cook, winner of the seventh season of American Idol performed the song. Following his performance, Cook's version peaked at number 14 on the Billboard Hot Digital Songs chart and number 28 on the Billboard Hot 100. Pat Green covered this song in his album Songs We Wish We'd Written II.

References

1995 singles
1995 songs
Atlantic Records singles
Collective Soul songs
RPM Top Singles number-one singles
Song recordings produced by Matt Serletic
Songs written by Ed Roland
Songs written by Ross Childress